Carl Skerlong (born September 23, 1988) is an American racing driver from Seattle, Washington.

Racing career
Skerlong began his racing career in Formula TR 1600 Pro Series in 2005, where he won the championship. In 2006, he raced in the Formula TR 2000 Pro Series where he won the championship, made two Star Mazda Series starts and, that fall, he raced in the Formula Renault 2.0 UK Winter Series where he finished eighth. In 2007, he raced in the Champ Car Atlantic Championship for US Racetronics with a best finish of second at Houston and finished second in points. He returned to the series in 2008 driving for Pacific Coast Motorsports, and captured his first win at New Jersey Motorsports Park where he finished sixth in points. In 2009, one start in the American Le Mans Series GT3 Challenge Class at Miller Motorsports Park was his only race appearance and he has not raced in 2010.

Accomplishments
Skerlong's most recent accomplishment was his 2009 induction to the DreamTeam, an elite group of extreme people doing outstanding things in amazing ways.

Carl's most recent accomplishment is creating Evolution homes (www.evohomeswa.com). " we build homes good and other stuff good too" - schooner man

Personal life
Carl married Megan Velazquez on April 11, 2015 at Salish Lodge in Snoqualmie, Washington. He now resides in Wenatchee, Washington with Megan, their son Duncan, and Labrador, Sobe.

References

External links
 
 

1988 births
Living people
Atlantic Championship drivers
British Formula Renault 2.0 drivers
North American Formula Renault drivers
American Le Mans Series drivers
Indy Pro 2000 Championship drivers
Racing drivers from Seattle

US RaceTronics drivers
Fortec Motorsport drivers